Maureen Neliya Ballard (née Hingert) (born 9 January 1937), also professionally known as Jana Davi is a former Sri Lankan dancer, model, actress and beauty pageant titleholder.

Biography 
Hingert was born on 9 January 1937 in Colombo, Ceylon. Her parents, Lionel Hingert and Lorna Mabel del Run, were of Dutch Burgher ancestry. Her father was an employee of the Bank of Ceylon. Hingert attended school at the Holy Family Convent in Bambalapitiya, Colombo until she was eighteen and continued her college education in Los Angeles, California in the United States.

In 1955, Hingert was crowned Miss Ceylon and subsequently selected as a contestant in Miss Universe 1955 pageant. She was the first Ceylonese representative to win an award at the Miss Universe pageant, after ended up as the second runner-up. Due to her very high placement in the contest, she has been revered as "putting Ceylon on the map" and being an ambassador to her country, Ceylon (now known as Sri Lanka).

She was also a dancer, and gave solo performances at the Shrine Auditorium in Los Angeles and other major Los Angeles venues.

Filmography 
Following the Miss Universe contest, Hingert was contracted to Universal International Studios and 20th Century Fox. Some of the movies she appeared in include The King and I, Fort Bowie, Gun Fever, The Adventures of Hiram Holiday, Moroccan Halk Moth, Pillars of the Sky, Dangerous Search, Gunmen from Laredo, The Rawhide Trail and the British TV Series Captain David Grief. She was sometimes billed in films as Jana Davi.

Personal life 
Hingert married an American designer and artist Mario Armond Zamparelli in 1958. Zamparelli was best known for his work as designer of Howard Hughes' empire. The couple had three daughters, one of whom – Gina Zamparelli (died 2018) – achieved fame in arts and entertainment and was active in the field of historic preservation.

In July 1970, Hingert divorced Zamparelli, and in 1976 she married with William J. Ballard in Los Angeles, United States. Ballard died in 2012.

References

External links
 

	

1937 births
20th Century Studios contract players
20th-century Sri Lankan actresses
Alumni of Holy Family Convent, Bambalapitiya
Burgher models
Living people
Miss Universe 1955 contestants
People from Colombo
People from British Ceylon
Sri Lankan female dancers
Sri Lankan film actresses
Sri Lankan people of Dutch descent